The 1984 U.S. Pro Tennis Championships was a men's tennis tournament played on outdoor green clay courts at the Longwood Cricket Club in Chestnut Hill, Massachusetts in the United States. The event was part of the Super Series of the 1984 Volvo Grand Prix circuit. It was the 57th edition of the tournament and was held from July 16 through July 22, 1984. Sixth-seeded Aaron Krickstein won the singles title and earned $34,000 first-prize money.

Finals

Singles

 Aaron Krickstein defeated  José Luis Clerc 7–6, 3–6, 6–4
 It was Krickstein's 1st singles title of the year and the  2nd of his career.

Doubles

 Ken Flach /  Robert Seguso defeated  Gary Donnelly /  Ernie Fernández 6–4, 6–4

References

External links
ITF tournament details
Longwood Cricket Club – list of U.S. Pro Champions

U.S. Pro Tennis Championships
U.S. Pro Championships
U.S. Pro Championships
U.S. Pro Championships
U.S. Pro Championships
Chestnut Hill, Massachusetts
Clay court tennis tournaments
History of Middlesex County, Massachusetts
Sports in Middlesex County, Massachusetts
Tennis tournaments in Massachusetts
Tourist attractions in Middlesex County, Massachusetts